Baphala is a genus of snout moths. It was described by Carl Heinrich in 1956.

Species
 Baphala homoeosomella (Zeller, 1881)
 Baphala eremiella (Dyar, 1910)
 Baphala glabrella (Dyar, 1919)
 Baphala goyensis 
 Baphala haywardi 
 Baphala pallida (Comstock, 1880)
 Baphala phaeolella Neunzig, 1997

References

Phycitinae
Pyralidae genera
Taxa named by Carl Heinrich